Obertheuria may refer to:

 Oberthueria (beetle), a genus of beetles in the family Carabidae
 Oberthueria (moth), a genus of moths in the family Endromidae